Easter Bunny (Christianity) – Anthropomorphic lagomorph.
 Easter Bilby (Australian) – Anthropomorphic bilby.
 Each Uisge (Scottish) – Malevolent water horse
 Eagle Spirit (Many cultures worldwide) – Leadership or guidance totem
 Ebu Gogo (Flores) – Diminutive humanoids, possibly inspired by Homo floresiensis
Echidna (Greek)
 Echeneis (Medieval Bestiaries) – Remora, said to attach to ships to slow them down
 Edimmu (Sumerian) – Ghosts of those not buried properly
 Egbere (Yoruba) – Humanoid that carries a magical mat
 Eikthyrnir  (Norse)
 Einherjar (Norse) – Spirits of brave warriors
 Ekek (Philippine) – Flesh-eating, winged humanoids
 Elbow Witch (Ojibwa) – Hags with awls in their elbows
 Eldjötnar (Norse) – Fire Giants who reside in Muspelheim, with Surtr as their leader
 Eleionomae (Greek) – Marsh nymph
 Elemental (Alchemy) – Personification of one of the Classical elements
 ‘Elepaio (Hawaiian) – Monarch flycatcher spirit that guides canoe-builders to the proper trees
 Elf (Germanic) – Nature and fertility spirit
 Eloko (Central Africa) – Little people and malevolent nature spirits
 Emere (Yoruba) – Child that can move back and forth between the material world and the afterlife at will
 Emim (Jewish) – Giant
 Empusa (Greek) – Female demon that waylays travelers and seduces and kills men
 Encantado (Brazilian) – Dolphin-human shapeshifter
 Enchanted Moor (Portuguese) – Enchanted princesses
 Enfield (Heraldic) – Fox-greyhound-lion-wolf-eagle hybrid
 Engkanto (Philippine) – Neutral nature spirit
 Enkō (Japanese) – Kappa of Shikoku and western Honshū
 Epimeliad (Greek) – Apple tree nymph
Erchitu (Sardinia) – Ox-human, wereox
 Er Gui (Chinese) – Hungry ghost
 Erinyes (Greek) – Winged spirits of vengeance or justice, also known as Furies
 Erlking (German) – Death spirit
 Erymanthian Boar (Greek) – Giant boar
 Ethiopian Pegasus (Medieval Bestiaries) – Horned, winged horse
 Etiäinen (Finnish mythology) – Spirit being of a living person
 Ettin (English) – Three-headed giant
 Eurynomos (Greek) – Blue-black, carrion-eater in the underworld
 Ewah (Cherokee) – Human-cougar hybrid
 Ežerinis (Lithuanian) – Lake spirit

E